Franz Egbert Riedweg (10 April 1907, in Lucerne – 22 January 2005, in Munich) was a Swiss far right Activist in the National Front (Switzerland) who, during World War II, served in the Waffen-SS as well as becoming a close associate of Heinrich Himmler.  

Riedweg himself spent most of the war in Germany.  In December 1947, Riedweg was sentenced in absentia by the Swiss Federal Criminal Court to 16 years in prison for treason.

External links

 Profile of Franz Riedweg
 

1907 births
2005 deaths
SS-Obersturmbannführer
Waffen-SS foreign volunteers and conscripts
Swiss collaborators with Nazi Germany
Swiss emigrants to Germany
People convicted of treason
Swiss Nazis
Nazis convicted in absentia